Sam Corlett  (born 24 April 1996) is an Australian actor who has appeared in The Dry,  Chilling Adventures of Sabrina (2020)  and Vikings: Valhalla (2022–present).

Life and education 
Corlett was born and raised on the Central Coast, New South Wales, Australia, with his parents being a counsellor and a tradesman. He was a professional model before he became an actor, working for Viviens Models. Corlett also had a high level involvement in sport growing up; he was captain of his school team at both rugby and basketball.

Veganism
Whilst filming Vikings: Valhalla at Ashford Studios in Wicklow, Ireland, Corlett started his working day with meditation, followed by a seven-kilometre run, then a swim in the very cold Irish Sea and some weight training each evening. Corlett is a vegan; he gained around 10kg in weight for the Valhalla role by eating a diet of stir-fries, containing bean sprouts, microgreens and kimchi, along with organic vegan protein, brown rice and peas. As Corlett was uncomfortable wearing real leather, he was provided with Desserto based body armour, a type of artificial leather made from cacti.

Career
In 2020, Corlett secured a recurring role as Caliban (Prince of Hell) for 14 episodes of Chilling Adventures of Sabrina opposite Kiernan Shipka, which was filmed in Vancouver, Canada.

Corlett plays the main role as Leif Eriksson in History's new Vikings sequel Vikings: Valhalla which was aired on Netflix in 2022. Corlett teams up with Leo Suter who plays Harald Sigurdsson and Frida Gustavsson as Freydís Eiríksdóttir in the Viking saga, set in a time over a century after the Lothbrok era. Eriksson was believed to be one of the first Europeans to explore North America.

Filmography

References

External links 
 
 

Living people
1995 births
21st-century Australian actors
Australian film actors
Australian television actors
Male actors from New South Wales
Western Australian Academy of Performing Arts alumni